Himatanthus stenophyllus is a species of plant in the family Apocynaceae. It is native to Colombia, NW Brazil, Guyana, and Suriname.

References

Data deficient plants
Flora of South America
stenophyllus
Plants described in 1990
Taxonomy articles created by Polbot